Koko and the Ghosts is a 2011 Croatian adventure film directed by Daniel Kušan. It is based on the children's novel of the same name by Ivan Kušan, Daniel Kušan's father.

Cast
 Antonio Parač as Koko Milić
 Nina Mileta as Marica Milić
 Kristian Bonačić as Zlatko
 Filip Mayer as Miki
 Ivan Maltarić as Božo
 Ozren Grabarić as Josip Milić
 Dijana Vidušin as Neda Milić
 Predrag Vušović as Vincek
 Franjo Dijak as Drago Horvatić
 Almira Osmanović as Ruža

Production
Originally titled Koko i duhovi, development for the film began in October 2010 as a co-production between HRT, Kinorama and Continental film.

Sequel
The film was followed by a commercially successful sequel in 2013, Zagonetni dječak.

References

External links
 

2011 films
2010s adventure films
2010s Croatian-language films
Croatian children's films
Films based on Croatian novels